Heat Wave is the first in a series of mystery novels featuring the characters Nikki Heat, an NYPD homicide detective, and Jameson Rook, a journalist. The novel and its sequels are published by Hyperion Books as a tie-in to the U.S. crime series Castle, and are attributed to that show's lead character Richard Castle. Heat Wave was published in 2009 and has been followed by Naked Heat (2010), Heat Rises (2011), Frozen Heat (2012), Deadly Heat (2013), Raging Heat (2014) and Driving Heat (2015).

Premise

Richard Castle is a best-selling author who has published the final book in his successful series, in which he killed off the main character after writing the books became too much "like work". He is desperately searching for a new muse. When a copy-cat killer stages the crime scenes right from the pages of his books, he is called in to assist Detective Kate Beckett and her team.

At the end of the pilot episode, he becomes Beckett's partner in order to do "research". Heat Wave is released at the start of the second season which aired just before the actual release of the book. Because of its success, ABC has released even more books, including a Derrick Storm trilogy and Derrick Storm graphic novels.

Plot summary
The title of the book refers to a heat wave that gripped the city, the heat that is inside the characters’ attraction for each other, and the character’s surname. Castle’s protagonist is NYPD homicide detective, Nikki Heat. Ms Heat is attractive, tough and means business when she’s on a case. Ms Heat is good at her job and is the leader of her team investigating murders. Heat’s boss, the commissioner, assigns Jameson Rook, a reporter, to be attached to her to do research on his article. Rook proves to be a challenge to Heat as he has a mind of his own.

As much as Heat hates Rook, she also feels a compelling force that draws him to her. Heat feels the heat between them. Ms Heat tries to handle her professional work, as well as answer to the call of nature as she falls for her handsome, magnetic shadow. In her work, Heat has to dig into the case of a real estate millionaire who fell to his death. His widowed wife was attacked but survived the confrontation.

Characters
 Detective Nikki Heat is the lead character in Richard Castle's Nikki Heat book series. Heat is "loosely" based on the fictional NYPD detective Kate Beckett, possessing a similar backstory, in that her decision to become a detective was motivated by the death of someone close to her - although Heat has a niece and siblings that Beckett lacks - and the first case she investigates is adapted from several real cases Castle helped Beckett solve. Heat is assisted by her partner and sometime lover, journalist Jameson Rook. In addition, her colleagues Detectives Raley and Ochoa also work with her on cases.
 Jameson Rook is a fictional character that Richard Castle created for his Nikki Heat series of crime novels. He is a famous magazine journalist who shadows the main character, Detective Nikki Heat, as well as being her on-again off-again love interest. The character moonlights as a romance novelist under the pen name Victoria St. Clair. He is based on Richard Castle himself and the way he works with Kate Beckett. ("Nikki Heat")
 Captain Charles Montrose is the captain of Heat's precinct and is based on Captain Montgomery.
 Detective Ochoa is based on Detective Esposito.
 Detective Raley is based on Detective Ryan. 
 Lauren Parry is the medical examiner and is based on Dr. Lanie Parish.
 Margaret Rook is Jameson Rook's mother and is based on Richard Castle's own mother Martha Rodgers.

Reception
Heat Wave reached #6 on the New York Times Bestseller list in its fourth week of release.

Footnotes

External links
goodreads.com - Heat Wave by Richard Castle

American crime novels
Castle (TV series)